Qaluy, also rendered as Qalu, may refer to:
 Qaluy Rasul Aqa
 Qaluy Sheykhan